Ron Cantelon (born 1943 or 1944) is a Canadian politician, who served in the Legislative Assembly of British Columbia from 2005 to 2013. He represented the ridings of Nanaimo-Parksville from 2005 to 2009, and Parksville-Qualicum from 2009 to 2013, as a member of the BC Liberal Party caucus.

He first entered elected political life as a city councillor for Nanaimo City Council in 1999. Prior to this, he had sought election as a Member of Parliament as a Liberal Party of Canada candidate. He has also acted as chair of the Nanaimo Conference Centre Advisory Committee, chair of the Downtown Nanaimo Partnership, director of the Nanaimo Regional District Board and president of the Port Theatre from 1994 to 1999.

He has won several awards including Tourism Nanaimo's Citizen of the Year 1999, Re/Max manager of the year for Western Canada in 1999 and was one of the 125 notable citizens for Nanaimo's 125th anniversary.

References

External links
BC Legislature profile

Year of birth missing (living people)
Living people
British Columbia Liberal Party MLAs
Members of the Executive Council of British Columbia
Nanaimo city councillors
21st-century Canadian politicians